The following are the scheduled events of association football for the year 2013 throughout the world.

Events

Men's national teams

Senior

 5 – 18 January: 21st Arabian Gulf Cup in 
   (2nd title)
  
  
 4th: 
 18 – 27 January: 2013 Copa Centroamericana in 
   (7th title)
  
  
 4th: 
 19 January – 10 February: 2013 Africa Cup of Nations in 
   (3rd title)
  
  
 4th: 
 15 – 30 June: 2013 FIFA Confederations Cup in 
   (4th title)
  
  
 4th: 
 6 – 20 July: 2013 COSAFA Cup in 
   (4th title)
  
  
 4th: 
 7 – 28 July: 2013 CONCACAF Gold Cup in the 
   (5th title)
  
 20 – 28 July: 2013 EAFF East Asian Cup in 
   (1st title)
   
  
 4th: 
 20 September – 2 October: 2013 SAFF Championship in 
   (1st title)
  
 26 October – 2 November: 2013 UEMOA Tournament in 
   (1st title)
  
 27 November – 12 December: 2013 CECAFA Cup in 
   (6th title)
   
  
 4th:

Youth

 9 January – 3 February: 2013 South American Youth Championship in 
   (3rd title)
  
  
 4th: 
 18 February – 3 March: 2013 CONCACAF U-20 Championship in 
   (12th title)
  
  
 4th: 
 7 – 15 March: 2013 Central American Games in 
   (3rd title)
  
  
 4th: 
 16 – 30 March: 2013 African U-20 Championship in 
   (4th title)
  
  
 4th: 
 17 – 30 March: 2013 OFC U-20 Championship in 
   (5th title)
  
  
 4th: 
 6 – 19 April: 2013 CONCACAF U-17 Championship in 
   (5th title)
  
  
 4th: 
 2 – 26 April: 2013 South American Under-17 Football Championship in 
  
 
 
4th:
 13 – 27 April: 2013 African U-17 Championship in 
  (1st title)
 
 
4th:
 17–25 April: OFC Under 17 Championship in 
   (5th title)
  
  
 4th: 
 5 – 17 May: 2013 UEFA European Under-17 Football Championship in 
   (3rd title) 
  
 28 May – 8 June: 2013 U-21 Toulon Tournament in 
   (7th title)
  
  
 4th: 
 5 – 18 June: 2013 UEFA European Under-21 Football Championship in 
   
    
 21 June – 13 July: 2013 FIFA U-20 World Cup in 
   (1st title)
     
  
 4th: 
 20 July – 1 August: 2013 UEFA European Under-19 Football Championship in 
   (1st title)
  
  
 4th: 
 17 October – 8 November: 2013 FIFA U-17 World Cup in the 
  
  
  
 4th: 
 7 December – 21 December: 2013 Southeast Asian Games in 
  
  
  
 4th: 

 1: 2nd title for Russia since the Dissolution of the Soviet Union in 1991. UEFA records treat Russia and the Soviet Union as the same.

Women's national teams
 6 – 13 March: 2013 Algarve Cup in 
   (9th title)
  
  
 4th: 
 25 – 28 June: 2013 UEFA Women's U-17 Championship in 
   (1st title)
  
  
 4th: 
 10 – 28 July: UEFA Women's Euro 2013 in 
   (8th title)
  
  
 4th: 
 20 – 27 July: 2013 EAFF Women's East Asian Cup in 
   (1st title)
   
  
 4th: 
 19 – 31 August: 2013 UEFA Women's U-19 Championship in 
   (3rd title)
  
  , 
 26 September – 6 October: 2013 AFC U-16 Women's Championship in 
   (3rd title)
  
  
 4th: 
 11 – 20 October: 2013 AFC U-19 Women's Championship in 
   (2nd title)
  
  
 4th:

News 
 June 20 – Abby Wambach becomes the all-time leading international goal scorer for either men or women. Her four goals for the USA in a friendly against South Korea in Harrison, New Jersey bring her career total to 160, surpassing the 158 of fellow American Mia Hamm.

Fixed dates for national team matches 
Scheduled international matches per their International Match Calendar. Also known as FIFA International Day/Date(s).
 6 February
 23–27 March 
 8–12 June
 21 August 
 7–11 September
 12–16 October 
 16–20 November

Club continental champions

Men

Women

Domestic leagues

CONCACAF nations

Men

Women

CONMEBOL nations

Men

Women

AFC nations

Men

Women

UEFA nations

Men

Women

CAF nations

OFC nations

Domestic cups

UEFA nations

AFC nations

CONCACAF nations

CONMEBOL nations

Men

Women

CAF nations

Deaths

January
 1 January – Lucio Dell'Angelo, Italian footballer (born 1938)
 2 January – Ladislao Mazurkiewicz, Uruguayan footballer (born 1945)
 2 January – Rudolf Szanwald, Austrian footballer (born 1931)
 4 January – Lassaâd Ouertani, Tunisian footballer (born 1980)
 6 January – Jon Ander López, Spanish footballer (born 1976)
 8 January – Bernard Delcampe, French footballer (born 1932)
 8 January – Cornel Pavlovici, Romanian footballer (born 1942)
 12 January – Harry Fearnley, English footballer (born 1935)
 12 January – Roy Sinclair, English footballer (born 1944)
 13 January – Geoff Thomas, English footballer (born 1948)
 15 January – Zurab Popkhadze, Georgian footballer (born 1972)
 18 January – Martin Barbarič, Czech footballer (born 1970)
 18 January – Ken Jones, English footballer (born 1936)
 18 January – Alfons Lemmens, Dutch footballer (born 1919)
 19 January – Ian Wells, English footballer (born 1964)
 22 January – Jimmy Payne, English footballer (born 1926)
 23 January – Jacques Grimonpon, French footballer (born 1925)
 24 January – Dave Harper, English footballer (born 1938)
 24 January – Miroslav Janů, Czech footballer (born 1959)
 28 January – Ladislav Pavlovič, Slovak footballer (born 1926)
 29 January – Reg Jenkins, English footballer (born 1938)

February
 3 February – Wolfgang Abraham, German footballer (born 1942)
 3 February – Zlatko Papec, Croatian footballer (born 1934)
 8 February – Ron Hansell, English footballer (born 1930)
 8 February – Kjell Hjertsson, Swedish footballer (born 1922)
 8 February – Ian Lister, Scottish footballer (born 1946)
 11 February – Teodor Lucuță, Romanian footballer (born 1955)
 11 February – Alfred Zijai, Albanian footballer (born 1961)
 12 February – Jimmy Mulroy, Irish Gaelic footballer (born 1940)
 12 February – Frank Seator, Liberian striker (born 1975)
 14 February – Luis Cruzado, Peruvian football midfielder (born 1941)
 14 February – Zdeněk Zikán, Czech footballer (born 1937)
 18 February – Okey Isima, Nigerian footballer (born 1956)
 19 February – John Downie, Scottish footballer (born 1925)
 20 February – Emma McDougall, English footballer (born 1991)
 20 February – Antonio Roma, Argentine footballer (born 1932)
 20 February – Yussef Suleiman, Syrian footballer (born 1986)
 21 February – Nazem Ganjapour, Iranian footballer (born 1943)
 21 February – Hasse Jeppson, English footballer (born 1925)
 21 February – Dick Neal Jr., English footballer (born 1933)
 24 February – Seamus O'Connell, English footballer (born 1930)
 26 February – Dobrivoje Trivić, Serbian footballer (born 1943)
 27 February – Terry Twell, English footballer (born 1947)
 28 February – Theo Bos, Dutch footballer (born 1965)
 28 February – Jean Van Steen, Belgian footballer (born 1929)

March
 March 1 – Ludwig Zausinger, German footballer (84)
 March 2 – Jimmy Jackson, Scottish footballer (81)
 March 3 – Luis Cubilla, Uruguayan footballer (72)
 March 4 – Seki Matsunaga, Japanese footballer (84)
 March 4 – George Petherbridge, English footballer (85)
 March 6 – Dave Bewley, English footballer (92)
 March 7 – Dick Graham, English footballer (91)
 March 7 – Stan Keery, English footballer (81)
 March 7 – Willie McCulloch, Scottish footballer (85)
 March 7 – Jan Zwartkruis, Dutch footballer (87)
 March 8 – Kai Pahlman, Finnish footballer (77)
 March 12 – Gordon Pembery, Welsh footballer (86)
 March 14 – Harry Thomson, Scottish footballer (72)
 March 15 – Felipe Zetter, Mexican footballer (89)
 March 17 – François Sermon, Belgian footballer (89)
 March 20 – Vasile Ianul, Romanian footballer (67)
 March 21 – Angus Carmichael, Scottish footballer (87)
 March 21 – Aníbal Paz, Uruguayan goalkeeper, winner of the 1950 FIFA World Cup. (95)
 March 22 – Fred Jones, English footballer (75)
 March 24 – Derek Leaver, English footballer (82)
 March 24 – Paolo Ponzo, Italian footballer (41)
 March 26 – Jerzy Wyrobek, Polish footballer (63)
 March 31 – Ray Drake, English footballer (78)

April
 29 April: Kevin Moore, English footballer (born 1958)

May
 22 May: Brian Greenhoff, English international footballer (born 1953)
 24 May: Ron Davies, Welsh international footballer (born 1942)

June
 15 June: Heinz Flohe, German international footballer (born 1948)
 16 June: Ottmar Walter, German international footballer (born 1924)
 27 June: Stefano Borgonovo, Italian international footballer (born 1964)
 30 June: Ingvar Rydell, Swedish international footballer (born 1922)

July
 1 July: Bent Schmidt-Hansen, Danish footballer (born 1946)
 1 July: Ján Zlocha, Slovak footballer (born 1942)
 4 July: Jack Crompton, English footballer (born 1921)
 8 July: Albert Dehert, Belgian footballer (born 1921)
 8 July: Dave Hickson, English footballer (born 1929)
 9 July: Andrzej Czyżniewski, Polish footballer (born 1953)
 14 July: George Smith, English footballer (born 1921)
 17 July: Luis Ubiña, Uruguayan footballer (born 1940)
 18 July: Anatoly Budayev, Belarusian footballer (born 1969)
 19 July: Bert Trautmann, German footballer (born 1923)
 19 July: Phil Woosnam, Welsh footballer (born 1932)
 20 July: André Grobéty, Swiss footballer (born 1933)
 22 July: Lawrie Reilly, Scottish international footballer (born 1928)
 23 July: Luis Mendez, Belizean footballer (born 1990)
 23 July: Djalma Santos, Brazilian international footballer (born 1929)
 27 July: Sékou Camara, Malian footballer (born 1985)
 29 July: Christian Benítez, Ecuadorian international footballer (born 1986)
 30 July: Antoni Ramallets, Spanish footballer (born 1924)

August
 1 August: Collin McAdam, Scottish footballer (born 1951)
 1 August: Ritham Madubun, Indonesian footballer (born 1971)
 2 August: Kurt Ehrmann, German international footballer (born 1922)
 3 August: Jack Hynes, Scottish footballer (born 1920)
 4 August: Wilf Carter, English footballer (born 1933)
 5 August: Malcolm Barrass, English footballer (born 1924)
 6 August: Steve Aizlewood, Welsh footballer (born 1952)
 6 August: Dave Wagstaffe, English footballer (born 1943)
 6 August: Selçuk Yula, Turkish footballer (born 1959)
 7 August: Keith Skillen, English footballer (born 1948)
 8 August: Chikondi Banda Malawian footballer (born 1979)
 8 August: Johnny Hamilton, Scottish footballer (born 1935)
 11 August: Bob Bignall, Australian footballer (born 1922)
 13 August: Alfonso Lara, Chilean footballer (born 1946)
 13 August: Jean Vincent, French footballer (born 1930)
 16 August: John Ryden, Scottish footballer (born 1931)
 16 August: Francesco Scaratti, Italian footballer (born 1939)
 19 August: Reha Eken, Turkish footballer (born 1925)
 20 August: Costică Ștefănescu, Romanian footballer (born 1951)
 20 August: Fred Martin, Scottish footballer (born 1929)
 22 August: Andrea Servi, Italian footballer (born 1984)
 24 August: Newton de Sordi, Brazilian international footballer (born 1931)
 25 August: Gylmar dos Santos Neves, Brazilian international footballer (born 1930)
 27 August: Zoltán Kovács, Hungarian footballer (born 1986)
 27 August: Héctor Sanabria, Argentine footballer (born 1985)
 28 August: László Gyetvai, Hungarian footballer (born 1918)
 28 August: Francis Kajiya, Zambian footballer (born 1954)
 28 August: Barry Stobart, English footballer (born 1938)
 29 August: Artan Bushati, Albanian football coach (born 1963)

September
 1 September: Pál Csernai, Hungarian footballer and international coach (born 1932)
 1 September: Ignacio Eizaguirre, Spanish international footballer (born 1920)
 4 September: Ferdinand Biwersi, German referee (born 1934)
 7 September: Wolfgang Frank, German footballer and manager (born 1951)
 7 September: Marek Špilár, Slovakian international footballer (born 1975)
 11 September: Fernand Boone, Belgian international footballer (born 1934)
 19 September: Gerrie Mühren, Dutch international footballer (born 1946)
 23 September: Vlatko Marković, Yugoslavian international footballer (born 1937)

October
 1 October: Peter Broadbent, English international footballer (born  1933)
 14 October: Bruno Metsu, French footballer (born 1954)

November
 3 November: Ryszard Kraus Polish international footballer (born 1964)
 5 November: Stuart Williams Welsh international footballer (born 1930)
 12 November: Erik Dyreborg, Danish footballer (born 1940)
 14 November: Bennett Masinga, South African international footballer (born 1965)
 16 November: Arne Pedersen, Norwegian international footballer (born 1931)
 24 November: Amedeo Amadei, Italian international footballer and manager (born 1921)
 25 November: Bill Foulkes, English international footballer and manager (born 1932)
 27 November: Nílton Santos, Brazilian international footballer (born 1925)

December
 2 December: Pedro Rocha, Uruguayan international footballer (born 1942)
 18 December: Büyük Jeddikar, Iranian international footballer (born 1929)
 24 December: Serghei Stroenco, Moldovan international footballer (born 1967)
 29 December: Ilya Tsymbalar, Ukrainian and Russian international footballer (born 1969)
 30 December: Akeem Adams, Trinidadian international footballer (born 1991)

References

External links
 Fédération Internationale de Football Association (FIFA) – FIFA.com

 
Association football by year